KTUI (1560 AM) is a daytime only radio station licensed to Sullivan, Missouri, United States.  The station airs a Talk radio format and is currently owned by Dean Brueseke and Robert Scott, through licensee Meramec Area Broadcasting LLC.

References

External links

TUI (AM)
Talk radio stations in the United States
TUI (AM)